Justice Powers may refer to:

Frederick A. Powers, associate justice of the Maine Supreme Judicial Court
George M. Powers, associate justice of the Vermont Supreme Court
H. Henry Powers, associate justice of the Vermont Supreme Court
Orlando W. Powers, associate justice of the Utah Supreme Court
William E. Powers, associate justice of the Rhode Island Supreme Court
Justice Powers (American football), American football offensive tackle